The 2018 LMP3 Cup Championship will be the second season for the British LMP3 Cup. The calendar was announced on 10 November 2017, with the same venues as the previous year, but in a different order. The series will now finish at Silverstone, one month later than in 2017.

Michelin will supply the tyres, a change from Pirelli in 2017, and French manufacturer Norma intends to race its M30 car, which would make it the first non-Liger JS P3 in the series.

Teams

Races

References

External links
 

LMP3 Cup